Paul Tillman Smith is an American drummer, percussionists, songwriter, artistic director, band leader, and promoter. Smith is a native of Oakland, California, United States. He has written for Pharoah Sanders, LaToya London, and Phyllis Hyman. He is one of the co-founders of the Berkeley Junteenth Festival in Berkeley, California. Smith is the Director of the Bay Area Jazz Society. His record label is Chump Change Records, and his band is 'Park Place'. He has written over 150 songs, and has worked  with Levi Seacer Jr., and Norman Connors on many record albums.

Early life
Smith got his first pair of drumsticks when he was four years old from his father George Smith. His father was a drummer and known as Kansas City Smitty. His father performed with Count Basie, Trumer Young, and the Harlem Aces.  He got his first professional drumming gig  with Blues legend Lightnin Hopkins when he was 15. It was at the Continental Club in West Oakland, California. He was encouraged to play the piano by his mother at the age of 15.  After attending High School he played with the rock legend Steve Miller. The hippy band was called the "Second Coming".

Career
When Paul T. Smith was 19 he left Oakland, California with bassist/percussionist Juma Sultan. He lived in the basement of singer Richie Havens' house in the East Village of New York City. Smith started his music career as an avant-garde jazz drummer in New York City's Lower East Side in 1967. At the time he was friends with Jazz drummer Norman Connors. He has performed or recorded with many music legends, John Handy Quarters, Abbey Lincoln, Dewey Redman, Faye Carol, Harold Land, Lorez Alexander, Odia Coates, The Head Hunters, Etta James, Jon Hendricks, Marlena Shaw, Gary Bartz, Reggie Lucas, Jimmy McCracklin, Richard Pryor, Bobby Lyle, Pharoah Sanders, Albert Ayler, Cecil McBee, Sonny Simmons, John Handy, Bobby Hutcherson, Merl Saunders, Ed Kelly, George Duke, Woody Shaw, Alice Coltrane, Bill Bell, Eddie Henderson, (jazz violinist) Michael White, Jackie McLean, Donnie Williams, Latoya London, Robert Stewart (saxophonist), Rosie Gaines, Levi Seacer Jr., Rodney Franklin, Kenneth Nash, and Khalil Shaheed.

In the 1970 and 1980s, Smith promoted free concerts in Berkeley, California's Provo Park, and in Oakland, California's Mosswood Park. When he was the music and concert Alameda County Neighborhood Arts Program.

Smith, along with Sam Dykes, and R.D. Bonds,  are the co-founders of the annual Berkeley, California Juneteenth festival. Which is one of the oldest, largest, and longest running African American Arts and Music festival in Northern California. He has also been stage manager for the Richmond Juneteenth festival, and the Oakland California Port Festival. He has also organized the music program for the city of Emeryville's Appreciation Day Festival, and the Vallejo Fourth of July festival. He has managed the Berkeley's Artspark Festival.

In 1977, Smith recorded "Sharing" with the band "Vitamin E" along with Bianca Thornton, known as Lady Bianca, and David Gardner for Buddha Records. "Sharing" featured Sly Stone & Frank Zappa,  vocals Lady Bianca, and David Gardener. “Sharing” album was produced by Norman Connors.

In 2001, Smith's “Crying for Love” recording won the year's Blues and Soul magazines award.

In 2002, Smith founded the Big Belly Blues Band. The name of the band originated from a blues song written by Paul Smith and co-written by Faye Carol in Oakland, California.

In 2013, Smith released 'Bed Ballads' as band leader. The album brought together his best performances over a period of forty years. The vocalists and musicians on the album are Paul Tillman Smith, Phyllis Hyman, Lenny Williams, Pharoah Sanders, the Brecker Brothers, Jon Faddis, James Gadson, Mtume, Bobby Lyle, Wah Wah Watson, and David T. Walker. The album was produced by Norman Connors.

Discography
 1977 - Sharing with Vitamin E   (Buddah Records) band
 2002 - The Invisible Man  (Chump Change Records)			
 2013 - Bed Ballads (CD Album) 
 2017 - A Beautiful Heart (CD Album)

Musical groups
 Bridge
 Park Place
 Vitamin E
 Big Belly Blues Band

Theater and film credits
 Musical director for Melvin Van Peebles Ain’t Supposed To Die A Natural Death.
 Paul T. Smith along with Lonnie Hewitt (Cal Tjader)'s pianist wrote songs for the Off-Broadway play Dunbar, based on the writings of Paul Lawrence Dunbar. Dunbar won a New York Audelco Theater Award.
 Twelve of his songs were showcased in the 2005 feature film, Tears of a Clown. It was produced by Tony Spires.

References

External links
 The-Invisible-Man 
 The Big Belly Blues Band

American music arrangers
Living people
American male drummers
American jazz drummers
American funk drummers
American percussionists
Soul-jazz drummers
Buddah Records artists
20th-century American drummers
20th-century American male musicians
American male jazz musicians
Jazz-funk musicians
Jazz-funk drummers
Songwriters from California
American lyricists
Musicians from the San Francisco Bay Area
Musicians from Berkeley, California
Year of birth missing (living people)
Jazz musicians from California
American male songwriters